Simone Andreetta (born 30 August 1993) is an Italian former professional racing cyclist, who rode for UCI Professional Continental team  from 2015 until 2018. He was named in the start list for the 2016 Giro d'Italia.

Major results

2011
 2nd Overall Giro della Lunigiana
1st Stage 2
2012
 10th Giro del Belvedere
2013
 2nd Trofeo Banca Popolare di Vicenza
 5th Gran Premio di Poggiana
2014
 1st Giro del Belvedere
 2nd Road race, National Under-23 Road Championships
 3rd Trofeo Città di San Vendemiano
 4th Gran Premio di Poggiana
 6th Overall Giro del Friuli-Venezia Giulia
1st  Mountains classification
1st  Young rider classification
1st Stage 4
2016
 8th Gran Premio di Lugano
2018
 8th Giro dell'Appennino

Grand Tour general classification results timeline

References

External links
 

1993 births
Living people
Italian male cyclists
People from Vittorio Veneto
Cyclists from the Province of Treviso
21st-century Italian people